Alcamarina (possibly from Aymara and Quechua allqamari mountain caracara,  -na a Quechua suffix, may be "the place of the mountain caracara") is a  mountain in the Vilcanota mountain range in the Andes of Peru. It is situated in the Cusco Region, Canchis Province, Pitumarca District. Alcamarina lies northwest of Orco Puñuna and west of Othaña.

References

Mountains of Peru
Mountains of Cusco Region